Charles Tempest may refer to:

Sir Charles Tempest, 1st baronet of the Tempest family

See also
Charles Tempest-Hicks
Charles Vane-Tempest-Stewart (disambiguation)